An Immortal Man (En udødelig mann) is a miniseries on Henrik Ibsen's childhood and youth in three episodes, produced by the NRK in 2006 on the occasion of the 100th anniversary of Ibsen's death. It was directed by Berit Nesheim and written by Siri Senje, and first broadcast on NRK1 on 26, 27 and 28 December 2006.

Actors
Henrik Ibsen (child): Sigurd Arntzen
Hedvig Ibsen: Gina Victoria Ulveie Lia
Henrik Ibsen (teenager): Anders Baasmo Christiansen
Knud Ibsen: Sven Nordin
Marichen Ibsen: Kjersti Holmen
Hedvig Ibsen (teenager): Birgitte Larsen
Grandmother Johanne Paus: Lise Fjeldstad
(Step) grandfather Ole Paus: Per Theodor Haugen
Uncle Henrik Johan Paus: Eindride Eidsvold
Uncle Christopher Blom Paus: Erland Bakker
Cathrine Paus: Odille A. Heftye Blehr
Hilde Paus: Anna Lena Hansen
The Rat Wife (Aunt Ploug): Wenche Foss
Else Sofie: Laila Goody
Clara Ebbel: Kaia Varjord
Reimann: Bjørn Sundquist
Madam Reimann: Marika Enstad
Miss Crawford: Stina Ekblad
Christopher Due: Joachim Rafaelsen
Ole Schulerud: Kim Sørensen
Latin teacher: Svein Erik Brodal
Lars Nielsen: Mads Ousdal

References

Henrik Ibsen
2006 television films
2006 films